Himchari National Park is a major national park and nature reserve in Bangladesh. The park is located at Ramu and Cox's Bazar Sadar Upazila, Cox's Bazar District, in the southeast region of the country. It is located mainly on the hills and is adjoining to Bay of Bengal to the west.
It was declared a protected area in 1980.

Location
It is located 13 km East of Cox's Bazar town.
The overall appearance of the forest is various patches of dense forest and grass lands. The climate is generally humid and warm. The park has tropical monsoons from June to September every year. The soil is loamy, clay and sandy loam at various places.

Administration
The entire forest area is managed and is under the jurisdiction of Cox's Bazar South Forest Division. There are four forest beats in the parks namely Kolatoli, Chainda, Jhilongja  and Link Road.The place is visited mostly for the famous broken hills and Row of christmas trees.

Biodiversity

Flora
The general walk in the forest is not easy due to hilly terrain and dense vegetation. About 117 tree species belonging to 37 families have been recorded. Some near-endangered plant species recorded are Elaeis guineensis, Garcinia lanceifolia, Elaeocarpus tectorius, Elaeocarpus floribundus, Suregada multiflora, Lithocarpus elegans var. elegans and Acronychia pedunculata.

Fauna
The fauna consists mainly of Ridley sea turtle, 286 bird species and 26 mammal species. The barn swallow and Asian palm swift are common birds in the national park. Mammals include Hoolock gibbon, leopard cat, fishing cat, tiger, Asian black bear, sloth bear, Asian elephant, wild boar, Rhesus macaque and mongoose.

Human settlement
There are 4000 people living inside the National park area. They are mostly migrants and are involved in fishing and cultivation for their livelihood.

Threats
The loss of tree diversity and population is due to encroachment for cultivation, invasion of weed species, grazing of cattle, collection of minor forest produces and fuel wood, fire hazard, expansion of network of roads and other infrastructure projects.

See also

 List of protected areas of Bangladesh

References

National parks of Bangladesh
Forests of Bangladesh
Lower Gangetic Plains moist deciduous forests